Lake Alice Hospital was a rural psychiatric facility in Lake Alice, Manawatū-Whanganui, New Zealand. It was opened in August 1950, and had a maximum security unit. Like many New Zealand psychiatric hospitals, Lake Alice was largely self-sufficient, with its own farm, workshop, bakery, laundry, and fire station. It also had swimming pools, glasshouses, and vegetable gardens.

The facility slowly shut down during the mid-1990s, finally closing its doors in October 1999.

The buildings and  grounds were purchased in July 2006 by Auckland accountant and property developer group Lake Hicks Ltd.

Plans to develop the former psychiatric hospital were scrapped after the owners fell into financial difficulties. The property was sold again in December 2008. The new owners intend to demolish most of the buildings including the infamous maximum security unit. A few buildings such as the administration block will remain and the land will be used for farming.

Abuse investigation 
Former patients of the hospital's child and adolescent unit made allegations that abuse took place there during the 1970s, including the use of electroconvulsive therapy without anaesthetic and paraldehyde injections as punishment. The New Zealand government issued a written apology in 2001, and has paid out a total of NZ$10.7 million in compensation to a smaller group of 183 former patients  but refused to acknowledge and offer redress for the long term effects of physical, sexual, and psychological abuse and torture. This forced applications to the UN Committee Against Torture (CAT) in 2019. In the Crown's own internal business policy documents it stated it would not recognize long term effects of abuse and would then categorize different forms of abuse and torture in a payment matrix.  

Dr Selwyn Leeks, the former head of the unit, gave up the practice of medicine in 2006 to forestall a disciplinary hearing by the Medical Practitioners Board of Victoria.

The New Zealand Police conducted an investigation dubbed Operation Lake Alice, which included interviews with former staff and 63 former patients. In June 2021, the Royal Commission of Inquiry into Abuse in Care held an 11 day hearing into the practices of Selwyn Leeks and the Adolescent Unit. On 8 June 2021, police announced they would lay charges after finding evidence of criminal wrongdoing. Leeks and one other former staff member, then in their 90s, were deemed unfit to stand trial due to ill health and were not formally charged. Leeks died several months later in January 2022. One other surviving former staff member will face prosecution.

References

External links
 Lake Alice Hospital Website: critical website, with photos of buildings

Psychiatric hospitals in New Zealand
Defunct hospitals in New Zealand
Hospital buildings completed in 1950
Hospitals established in 1950
1950 establishments in New Zealand
Hospitals disestablished in 1999
1999 disestablishments in New Zealand
Medical controversies in New Zealand
Scandals in New Zealand